Elizabeth Brandon may refer to:

Elizabeth Grey, Viscountess Lisle, married name Brandon (1505–1519), English noblewoman
Elizabeth Douglas-Hamilton, Duchess of Hamilton and Brandon (1916–2008)